Ambush Trail is a 1946 American Western film directed by Harry L. Fraser and written by Elmer Clifton. The film stars Bob Steele, Syd Saylor, I. Stanford Jolley, Lorraine Miller, Charles King, John Cason and Budd Buster. The film was released on February 17, 1946, by Producers Releasing Corporation.

Plot

Cast          
Bob Steele as Curley Thompson
Syd Saylor as Sam Hawkins
I. Stanford Jolley as Hatch Bolton
Lorraine Miller as Alice Rhodes
Charles King as Al Craig 
John Cason as Ed Blaine 
Budd Buster as Jim Haley
Kermit Maynard as Walter Gordon
Frank Ellis as Owens 
Ed Cassidy as Marshal Dawes

References

External links
 

1946 films
1940s English-language films
American Western (genre) films
1946 Western (genre) films
Producers Releasing Corporation films
Films directed by Harry L. Fraser
American black-and-white films
1940s American films